The New Kids is a 1985 American   horror thriller film, directed by Sean S. Cunningham and starring Shannon Presby, Lori Loughlin and James Spader. The film was released on January 18, 1985, by Columbia Pictures.

Plot 
When Abby and Loren McWilliams' parents are killed in an accident, it is decided that they will live in the small town of Glenby, Florida with their uncle Charlie and aunt Fay, who own a gas station and a small amusement park, both of which share the property.

Loren and Abby do not have much trouble making friends at their new school; Loren starts dating local sheriff's daughter Karen, while Abby begins seeing a guy named Mark. However, trouble arises when Loren sees a guy harassing Abby one day at school in the cafeteria. Mark tells Loren and Abby that the thug is Eddie Dutra, a drug-addicted teenager who heads a gang as bad as he is, with Gideon, Moonie, Gordo and Joe Bob.

Dutra finds Abby attractive, and uses that as his motive. Loren helps Abby keep Dutra at a distance, and Dutra does not like that at all.

Dutra and his gang start retaliating against Loren for keeping them away from Abby. Dutra's retaliations keep getting more and more vicious until Dutra forces a showdown at the amusement park by kidnapping Abby.

Charlie is severely injured by Dutra. Gordo is killed by a vicious dog, and Dutra kills the dog. Loren causes Moonie to be thrown to his death from the Ferris wheel, then Loren causes Joe Bob to be electrocuted above the bumper car ride, then Loren uses the roller coaster to decapitate Gideon.

Dutra then fires a shot at Abby, who flees to the parking lot of the gas station, where Dutra hits her with the gun. Dutra then grabs a nozzle from one of the gas pumps and lights it up to be used as a flame thrower. Loren grabs Dutra, and Loren and Dutra struggle over the nozzle. Dutra dies when Loren forces the nozzle to Dutra's face, setting Dutra on fire.

Charlie survives his injuries, and the park is reopened with a substantial spike in business due to the notoriety of the crimes that happened there. As Abby, Loren and Karen drive away in a car, Joe Bob's little brother looks on in a threatening state.

Cast 
 Shannon Presby as Loren McWilliams
 Lori Loughlin as Abby McWilliams
 James Spader as Eddie Dutra
 John Philbin as Gideon
 David H. MacDonald as Moonie
 Vince Grant as Joe Bob
 Theron Montgomery as Gordo
 Eddie Jones as Charlie McWilliams
 Lucy Martin as Fay McWilliams
 Eric Stoltz as Mark
 Paige Lyn Price as Karen
 Court Miller as Sheriff
 Tom Atkins as Mac McWilliams
 Jean De Baer as Mary Beth McWilliams
 Robertson Carricart as Deputy

Production 
Filming took place in Homestead, Florida.

Writer Harry Crews scripted the original draft of the film, but was not pleased with the finished product. His name does not appear in the credits, which attribute the story and screenplay to Stephen Gyllenhaal and Brian Taggert.

Critical reception 
AllMovie's review of the film was generally unfavorable.

References

External links 
 
 
 

1985 films
1985 horror films
1985 thriller films
1980s teen horror films
1985 independent films
American independent films
American teen films
American thriller films
Films directed by Sean S. Cunningham
Films scored by Lalo Schifrin
Homestead, Florida
Columbia Pictures films
1980s English-language films
1980s American films